John Bernard McDowell (born  February 12, 1942 in Saint Paul, Minnesota) is a former offensive tackle in the National Football League and played college football at Saint John's of Minnesota.

Career
McDowell was drafted by the Green Bay Packers in the ninth round of the 1964 NFL Draft and played that season with the team. The following season, he played with the New York Giants before being a member of the St. Louis Cardinals (Arizona Cardinals) during the 1966 NFL season.

He played at the collegiate level at St. John's University.

See also
List of Green Bay Packers players
List of New York Giants players

References

1942 births
Living people
Players of American football from Saint Paul, Minnesota
American football offensive tackles
Saint John's Johnnies football players
Green Bay Packers players
New York Giants players
St. Louis Cardinals (football) players